Kaj Blom (born 11 October 1925), is a Danish chess player, Danish Chess Championship medalist (1961, 1963, 1964).

Biography
From the early 1960s to the end of 1970s, Kaj Blom was one of Danish leading chess players. He participated many times in the finals of Danish Chess Championships and won three medals: silver (1964) and two bronze (1961, 1963). In 1961, in Mariánské Lázně Kaj Blom participated in World Chess Championship Zonal Tournament.

Kaj Blom played for Denmark in the Chess Olympiads:
 In 1960, at fourth board in the 14th Chess Olympiad in Leipzig (+6, =5, -3),
 In 1964, at fourth board in the 16th Chess Olympiad in Tel Aviv (+5, =5, -3).

Kaj Blom played for Denmark in the European Team Chess Championship preliminaries:
 In 1970, at fourth board in the 4th European Team Chess Championship preliminaries (+3, =0, -0).

References

External links

Kaj Blom chess games at 365chess.com

1925 births
Danish chess players
Chess Olympiad competitors
Living people